Dendrobium lituiflorum, the bent-racemed dendrobium, is a species of orchid. It is native to southern China (Yunnan, Guangxi), the Himalayas (Arunachal Pradesh, Assam, Bangladesh) and northern Indochina (Myanmar, Thailand, Laos, Vietnam).

References

lituiflorum
Flora of Indo-China
Flora of the Indian subcontinent
Orchids of China
Plants described in 1856